El Mocambo 1977 (also referred to as Live at the El Mocambo) is a live album by the English rock band the Rolling Stones, released on 13 May 2022. It was recorded on 4 and 5 March 1977 at the El Mocambo club in Toronto, Canada. The club had a capacity of 300, and the gigs were "secret", with winners of a contest invited to see Canadian rock band April Wine with support from a group called "the Cockroaches", who were actually the Stones. The set promoted the band's then-most recent studio album Black and Blue (1976); most tracks were taken from the second night (5 March), with only three from the first night.

It the first release since the August 2021 death of drummer Charlie Watts.

Critical reception

El Mocambo 1977 received a score of 86 out of 100 based on nine critics' reviews at review aggregator Metacritic, indicating "universal acclaim". Doug Collette of All About Jazz summarized the album as "recordings worth waiting for all these forty-five years years since they happened" and felt that it is "quite conceivable that, in fairly short order, this title will become the go-to choice for both aficionados and curious dilettantes". Hal Horowitz of American Songwriter called the 23 tracks a "solid, diverse set" that has "rightfully gone down in the tome of the Rolling Stones, and by extension rock and roll overall, as two of the most desirable times fans fantasize about being in the presence of a once-in-lifetime event". David Browne of Rolling Stone wrote that the band "play[s] with a ferocity that proves they were more than bored, disconnected rock stars" and the album "rolls out a band that was living in the moment, trying hard not to suck in the Seventies".

Track listing

Charts

See also
 Love You Live, the Rolling Stones' 1977 album that included several tracks from the sets with overdubs
 Live at the El Mocambo (April Wine album), recorded the same nights as the album

References

2022 live albums
Albums recorded at the El Mocambo
Polydor Records live albums
The Rolling Stones live albums